Sheng Zetian (born November 15, 1973) is a male Chinese wrestler. He competed at the 1992, 1996 and 2000 Olympic Games, winning a bronze medal in Greco-Roman wrestling on each occasion.

References

External links
 

1973 births
Living people
Olympic bronze medalists for China
Wrestlers at the 1992 Summer Olympics
Wrestlers at the 1996 Summer Olympics
Wrestlers at the 2000 Summer Olympics
Chinese male sport wrestlers
Olympic medalists in wrestling
Asian Games medalists in wrestling
Wrestlers at the 1994 Asian Games
Wrestlers at the 1998 Asian Games
Medalists at the 1994 Asian Games
Medalists at the 1998 Asian Games
Asian Games silver medalists for China
Asian Games bronze medalists for China
Medalists at the 1992 Summer Olympics
20th-century Chinese people
21st-century Chinese people